Hwaebul Sports Club is an association football club from Pochon, North Korea, founded in 2013. It is the sports club of the Kimilsungist-Kimjongilist Youth League and is based at the 5,000 capacity Hwaebul Stadium. They are presently playing in the DPR Korea Premier Football League.

History 
The team was given its name by Kim Jong-un when it was founded, in the hopes that the club would be a guiding light for football in North Korea, as "Hwaebul" means "torch" in Korean. Despite its newness, the club has already achieved considerable success, finishing third in their inaugural season, winning the Highest Class Football League in the second season, along with securing several wins in the Paektusan Prize, the Poch'ŏnbo Torch Prize, and other competitions. 

The club made its competitive debut in the 2013 competition of the Poch'ŏnbo Torch Prize, in which forward Kim Yong-gwang was top scorer with twelve goals, seven scored in the first round and five in the second round.

After having finished second in the Highest Class in 2017, Hwaebul are currently taking part in their first continental competition, the 2018 AFC Cup. They defeated Erchim FC of Mongolia with a 7–0 aggregate score in the qualifying play-offs, and have advanced to the group stage, where they will play matches against April 25 of North Korea, Hang Yuen of Taiwan, and Benfica of Macau to try to qualify for the knockout stage.

Current squad

Managers
 Jo In-chol (first)
 Il Mun-ho (current)

Continental record

Achievements

Domestic
DPR Korea League: 3
Champions: 2014
Third place: 2013

Hwaebul Cup: 2
Runners-up: 2014, 2016

Osandŏk Prize: 3
Champions: 2015, 2016, 2017

Paektusan Prize: 1
Champions: 2016

Poch'ŏnbo Torch Prize: 3
Champions: 2013, 2017
Runners-up: 2014

References

External links
Team's profile – Soccerway.com

Football clubs in North Korea